Hans Delmotte (15 December 1917, in Liège – 1945) was a Nazi SS doctor at the Auschwitz concentration camp in the branch of the Hygiene Institute of the Waffen-SS. He came from Liège, Belgium.

Initially he refused to take part in selections, allegedly going as far as to tell his superiors "You can send me to the front or gas me myself, but I won't do it." By the late fall of 1944 he finally was persuaded to take part in selections. For Delmotte's dissertation, he reserved a Jewish prisoner doctor and professor to assist him. For this research, Delmotte took part in typhus experiments on prisoners at Auschwitz. Delmotte's dissertation entitled "Contributions to pathological physiology of gastric secretion in typhoid fever" was already completed in 1944.

After the evacuation of Auschwitz in January 1945, Delmotte briefly continued to work in Dachau concentration camp. 

While trying to make his way back to Belgium, he was arrested by U.S. Army soldiers. During the transfer to a prison, Delmotte had somehow managed to shoot himself, he instantly died from his gunshot wound.

References

Literature

Ernst Klee: Auschwitz, die NS-Medizin und ihre Opfer. 3. Auflage. S. Fischer Verlag, Frankfurt am Main, 1997, .
Ernst Klee: Das Personenlexikon zum Dritten Reich: Wer war was vor und nach 1945. Fischer-Taschenbuch-Verlag, Frankfurt am Main 2007. 
Hermann Langbein: People in Auschwitz, Frankfurt am Main, Berlin, Wien: Ullstein, 1980; .
, Franciszek Piper (Hrsg.): Auschwitz 1940-1945. Studies on the History of the Concentration Camp and Death Camp Auschwitz. Verlag Staatliches Museum Auschwitz-Birkenau, Oswiecim 1999,  .
: The Hygiene Institute of the Waffen SS in Auschwitz: Hamburger Institut für Sozialforschung (Hrsg.): Die Auschwitz-Hefte, Band 1, Hamburg, 1994; .

External links
Literature on Hans Delmotte in the German National Library.
 Aleksander Lasik: Die Organisationsstruktur des KL Auschwitz, in: Aleksander Lasik, Franciszek Piper, Piotr Setkiewicz, Irena Strzelecka: Auschwitz 1940-1945. Studien zur Geschichte des Konzentrations und Vernichtungslagers Auschwitz., Band I: Aufbau und Struktur des Lagers, Staatliches Museum Auschwitz-Birkenau, Oświęcim 1999, S. 320.
 Hermann Langbein: "People in Auschwitz". Frankfurt am Main, Berlin Wien 1980, S. 405f.
 Robert Jay Lifton: "The murderers are amongst us", in: Der Spiegel, Ausgabe 27 vom 4. Juli 1988.
 Hans Münch über Delmotte Zitiert bei: Hermann Langbein: Menschen in Auschwitz. Frankfurt am Main, Berlin Wien 1980, S. 405
 »Die Mörder sind noch unter uns« Ns-Ärzte: Von der Euthanasie (The Murderers are still amongst us: NS-Doctors, on the Euthanasia"), in: Der Spiegel, Ausgabe 25 vom 20. Juni 1998.

1917 births
1945 suicides
Belgian collaborators with Nazi Germany
Belgian Waffen-SS personnel
Holocaust perpetrators in Poland
Physicians in the Nazi Party
Auschwitz concentration camp medical personnel
Dachau concentration camp personnel
Physicians from Liège
Belgian medical researchers
Suicides by firearm in Germany
Nazis who committed suicide in Germany
Nazis who committed suicide in prison custody
Prisoners who died in United States military detention